Typhoon Saudel, known in the Philippines as Typhoon Pepito, was a typhoon which affected the Philippines, Vietnam and Southern China in October 2020. The seventeenth tropical storm and seventh typhoon of the 2020 Pacific typhoon season. The name Saudel was used for the first time, replacing Typhoon Soudelor in 2015, which caused serious damages in Taiwan and Mainland China. Saudel formed from a tropical disturbance east of the Philippines. The disturbance gradually organized and crossed the Philippines as a tropical storm. Once the system emerged into the South China Sea, it began to rapidly organize and intensify, becoming a typhoon early on October 22.

Saudel flooded roads and buildings in the Philippines. It also struck Vietnam which has been devastated by flooding caused by a slew of tropical systems, though no damage was reported. Strong winds and high seas were recorded off the coast of Malaysia, prompting a tropical cyclone advisory. In Hainan, China, winds gusted up to 130 km/h (80 mph). Total damage from Saudel is estimated at more than $15 million.

Meteorological history

On October 18 at 21:00 UTC, the PAGASA upgraded the system into a tropical depression, and named the system Pepito. A few hours later, the Japan Meteorological Agency (JMA) also recognized the system as a tropical depression, and subsequently issued their first warning on the system. As the system intensified while it approached Northern Luzon, the JMA upgraded the system into a tropical storm and named the system Saudel on October 20. The PAGASA followed suit later that day. Saudel made landfall over the San Ildefonso Peninsula in Casiguran, Aurora on October 20 at 13:00 UTC (21:00 PHT) and began crossing the Luzon Island, emerging over the South China Sea hours later. As the storm left the Philippine Area of Responsibility, the developing severe tropical storm was upgraded into a typhoon by the JMA, the JTWC, and by the PAGASA in their final bulletin for the system. Saudel continued to gain strength gradually, and during 3:00 UTC on October 23, Saudel reached its peak intensity, with the JTWC estimating 1-min sustained winds of 100 mph (160 km/h), making the system a low-end category 2 typhoon,  However, the peak was short-lived, and at 9:00 UTC JTWC downgraded Saudel to a category 1 typhoon. As it approached Vietnam, it began to rapidly weaken due to high vertical wind shear and was downgraded to a tropical storm on October 24, 2020. The next day, it was downgraded to a remnant low as its center became mostly devoid of any deep convection.

Preparations and impact

Philippines

After the PAGASA declared Saudel a tropical storm, the agency issued Signal #2 tropical cyclone warnings in preparation for the storm's landfall. Prior to making landfall, Signal #2 was raised in 10 provinces and in parts of 4 provinces. In Quezon, many streets were flooded and people used boats for transport. A total of 6,000 people were evacuated. 335 people were displaced in Aurora Province. Rain from Saudel caused the rise of water level in Binga Dam in Benguet Province, prompting authorities to release water from the facility. In Quezon, numerous homes and schools were damaged. Heavy rains caused a concrete wall to collapse at the Siain Elementary School in Buenavista, Quezon. In addition, Sumulong Elementary School in Calauag town was again flooded, several days after Tropical Depression Ofel flooded the school. Rice fields were damaged from floods, and many farmers lost their crops. Many bridges were impassable after the storm in the Cagayan Valley after Saudel hit.

Immediately after the storm, Provincial Disaster Risk Reduction and Management Offices and Municipal Disaster Risk Reduction and Management Offices conducted damage assessments. 13 towns and 36 barangays, and 457 families, with a total of 1,576 individuals were affected by the storm. At least 25 evacuation centers were open with 295 families or 935 individuals. As of October 24, the NDRRMC has calculated a total damage of about ₱105.8 million (US$2.18 million).

China
Saudel was the seventeenth storm to hit China or its territories this season. The storm brought strong winds on the Qiongzhou Strait, forcing ships to stop service at 05:00 UTC on October 23. All passenger trains to and from Hainan stopped running due to the storm. The China Meteorological Administration issued a yellow alert, the third-highest level of alerts on its system, for Hainan. A peak wind gust of 130 km/h (80 mph) was recorded in Hainan. The storm, along with the seasonal monsoon, brought strong winds to Hong Kong.

Elsewhere

Vietnam was already dealing with severe flooding from tropical systems Linfa, Nangka, and Ofel.

The storm also caused strong winds and rough seas over waters off the Malaysian state of Sabah where the Malaysian Meteorological Department (MetMalaysia) had issued a tropical storm advisory with the distance between the storm and nearest town is about 1,315 kilometers northwest of Kudat.

See also

 Weather of 2020
 Tropical cyclones in 2020
 2020 Central Vietnam floods
 Typhoon Molave – another powerful typhoon that affected similar areas less than a week after

References

External links

Tropical cyclones in 2020
2020 Pacific typhoon season
Typhoons in the Philippines